The Last Precinct is an American sitcom television series that premiered on NBC January 26, and then aired weekly from April 11 to May 30, 1986 on Friday nights at 9:00pm. The series stars Adam West as Capt. Rick Wright, leading a group of misfit police academy rejects. The pilot for the Stephen J. Cannell series debuted after Super Bowl XX in 1986, but the show was canceled within two months of its April premiere. This was the only sitcom from Stephen J. Cannell Productions.

Plot
An odd mix of cops, including a transgender woman and an Elvis impersonator, are given one final opportunity to distinguish themselves in the field of law enforcement, when they are assigned to the 56th Precinct, Los Angeles' seediest and most woebegone unit. Under the leadership of Capt. Rick Wright, these losers-in-blue attempt possible redemption, if they can make an arrest without killing themselves.

Cast
 Adam West as Capt. Rick Wright
 Rick Ducommun as Officer William "Raid" Raider
 Ernie Hudson as Sgt. "Night Train" Lane
 Randi Brooks as Officer Mel Brubaker
 Vijay Amritraj as Alphabet
 Pete Willcox as The King
 Keenan Wynn as Butch
 Hank Rolike as Sundance
 Jonathan Perpich as Sgt. Price Pascall
 Lucy Lee Flippin as Officer Rina Starland
 Wings Hauser as Lt. Ronald Hobbs
 Yana Nirvana as Sgt. Martha Haggerty
 Geoffrey Elliot as Justin Dial
 James Cromwell as Chief Bludhorn
 Thomas F. Duffy as Harvey
 Nicholas Kadi as Norton

Episodes

References

External links
 The Last Precinct Pilot at the Internet Movie Database
 The Last Precinct Series at the Internet Movie Database

1980s American sitcoms
1986 American television series debuts
1986 American television series endings
1980s American crime television series
1980s American police comedy television series
English-language television shows
Fictional portrayals of the Los Angeles Police Department
NBC original programming
Super Bowl lead-out shows
Television series by 20th Century Fox Television
Television series by Stephen J. Cannell Productions
Television shows set in Los Angeles
Transgender-related television shows
1980s American LGBT-related comedy television series
Television series created by Stephen J. Cannell
Television series created by Frank Lupo